In economics and consumer theory, a Giffen good is a product that people consume more of as the price rises and vice versa—violating the basic law of demand in microeconomics. For any other sort of good, as the price of the good rises, the substitution effect makes consumers purchase less of it, and more of substitute goods; for most goods, the income effect (due to the effective decline in available income due to more being spent on existing units of this good) reinforces this decline in demand for the good. But a Giffen good is so strongly an inferior good in the minds of consumers (being more in demand at lower incomes) that this contrary income effect more than offsets the substitution effect, and the net effect of the good's price rise is to increase demand for it. This phenomenon is known as the Giffen paradox. A Giffen good is considered to be the opposite of an ordinary good.

Background

Giffen goods are named after Scottish economist Sir Robert Giffen, to whom Alfred Marshall attributed this idea in his book Principles of Economics, first published in 1890. Giffen first proposed the paradox from his observations of the purchasing habits of the Victorian era poor.

It has been suggested by Etsusuke Masuda and Peter Newman that Simon Gray described "Gray goods" in his 1815 text entitled The Happiness of States: Or An Inquiry Concerning Population, The Modes of Subsisting and Employing It, and the Effects of All on Human Happiness. The chapter entitled A Rise in the Price of Bread Corn, beyond a certain Pitch, tends to increase the Consumption of it, contains a detailed account of what have come to be called Giffen goods, and which might better be called Gray goods.

Analysis
For almost all products, the demand curve has a negative slope: as the price increases, demand for the good decreases.  (See Supply and demand for background.) Giffen goods are an exception to this general rule. Unlike other goods or services, the price point at which supply and demand meet results in higher prices and greater demand whenever market forces recognize a change in supply and demand for Giffen goods. As a result, when price goes up, the quantity demanded also goes up. To be a true Giffen good, the good's price must be the only thing that changes to produce a change in quantity demanded. A Giffen good should not be confused with products bought as status symbols or for conspicuous consumption (Veblen goods), although there may be some overlap as consumers are more likely to engage in conspicuous consumption as a way to engage in "aspirational spending" as a way to increase their social status.

The classic example given by Marshall is of inferior quality staple foods, whose demand is driven by poverty that makes their purchasers unable to afford superior foodstuffs. As the price of the cheap staple rises, they can no longer afford to supplement their diet with better foods, and must consume more of the staple food.

There are three necessary preconditions for this situation to arise:
 the good in question must be an inferior good,
 there must be a lack of close substitute goods, and
 the goods must constitute a substantial percentage of the buyer's income, but not such a substantial percentage of the buyer's income that none of the associated normal goods are consumed.

If precondition #1 is changed to "The goods in question must be so inferior that the income effect is greater than the substitution effect" then this list defines necessary and sufficient conditions. The last condition is a condition on the buyer rather than the goods itself, and thus the phenomenon is also called a "Giffen behavior".

Empirical evidence
Evidence for the existence of Giffen goods has generally been limited. A 2008 paper by Robert Jensen and Nolan Miller made the claim that rice and wheat/noodles are Giffen goods in parts of China.

Another 2008 paper by the same authors experimentally demonstrated the existence of Giffen goods among people at the household level by directly subsidizing purchases of rice and wheat flour for extremely poor families. In this paper, the field experiment conducted in 2017 consisted of the province of Hunan, where rice is a dietary staple, and the province of Gansu, where wheat is a staple. In both provinces, random households were selected and were offered their dietary staple at subsidized rates. After the completion of the project, it could be found that the demands from Hunan households who are offered by the rice fell drastically. Meanwhile, the demands of wheat in Gansu implies weak evidence of the Giffen paradox. It is easier to find Giffen effects where the number of goods available is limited, as in an experimental economy: DeGrandpre et al. (1993) provide such an experimental demonstration in human subjects. In this study, cigarette smokers chose between puffs on their preferred brand and puffs on a cheaper, inferior one with equal nicotine. As the price of the inferior brand increased, smokers purchased more of them, thereby maintaining nicotine levels.

In 1991, Battalio, Kagel, and Kogut published an article arguing that quinine water is a Giffen good for some lab rats. However, they were only able to show the existence of a Giffen good at an individual level and not the market level.

Giffen goods are difficult to study because the definition requires a number of observable conditions. One reason for the difficulty in studying market demand for Giffen goods is that Giffen originally envisioned a specific situation faced by individuals in poverty. Modern consumer behaviour research methods often deal in aggregates that average out income levels, and are too blunt an instrument to capture these specific situations. Complicating the matter are the requirements for limited availability of substitutes, as well as that the consumers are not so poor that they can only afford the inferior good. For this reason, many text books use the term Giffen paradox rather than Giffen good.

Some types of premium goods (such as expensive French wines, or celebrity-endorsed perfumes) are sometimes called Giffen goods—via the claim that lowering the price of these high status goods decreases demand because they are no longer perceived as exclusive or high status products. However, to the extent that the perceived nature of such high status goods actually changes significantly with a substantial price drop, this behavior disqualifies them from being considered Giffen goods, because the Giffen goods analysis assumes that only the consumer's income or the relative price level changes, not the nature of the good itself. If a price change modifies consumers' perception of the good, they should be analysed as Veblen goods. Some economists question the empirical validity of the distinction between Giffen and Veblen goods, arguing that whenever there is a substantial change in the price of a good its perceived nature also changes, since price is a large part of what constitutes a product.  However the theoretical distinction between the two types of analysis remains clear, which one should apply to any actual case is an empirical matter. Based on microeconomic consumer theory, it assumes that the consumer could value a good without knowing the price. However, when the consumers who were constrained by income and price need to choose the optimal goods, the goods must be valued with available prices. Because, in some degrees, the higher price indicates higher values of goods offering to the consumers.

Great Famine in Ireland
Potatoes during the Irish Great Famine were once considered to be an example of a Giffen good. Along with the Famine, the price of potatoes and meat increased subsequently. Compared to meat, it is obvious that potatoes could be much cheaper as a staple food. Due to poverty, individuals could not afford meat anymore; therefore, demand for potatoes increased. Under such a situation, the supply curve will increase with the rise in potatoes’ price, which is consistent with the definition of Giffen good. However, Gerald P. Dwyer and Cotton M. Lindsey challenged this idea in their 1984 article Robert Giffen and the Irish Potato, where they showed the contradicting nature of the Giffen "legend" with respect to historical evidence.

The Giffen nature of the Irish potato was also later discredited by Sherwin Rosen of the University of Chicago in his 1999 paper Potato Paradoxes. Rosen showed that the phenomenon could be explained by a normal demand model.

Charles Read has shown with quantitative evidence that bacon pigs showed Giffen-style behaviour during the Irish Famine, but that potatoes did not.

Other proposed examples
Some suggest that a number of other goods, such as cryptocurrencies like Bitcoin, rising prices on which fuels further demands, might be Giffen. Given limited supply of cryptocurrencies due to costly currency mining in time, resources and electricity, in relation to the supply curve of potatoes, the curve for bitcoins could be very inelastic as well. While the arguments are theoretically sound (i.e., they accord with Marshall's basic intuition), in each case the supporting empirical evidence has been found unconvincing. As with the Great Famine in Ireland, the emergence of new cryptocurrency and advanced technologies on mining currencies would push back the value of bitcoins. Besides, hackers could be a potential threat to the value of cryptocurrencies, which would break the situation.

Anthony Bopp (1983) proposed that kerosene, a low-quality fuel used in home heating, was a Giffen good. Schmuel Baruch and Yakar Kanai (2001) suggested that shochu, a Japanese distilled beverage, might be a Giffen good. In both cases, the authors offered supporting econometric evidence. However, the empirical evidence has been generally considered incomplete. In a 2005 article, Sasha Abramsky of The Nation conjectured that gasoline, in certain circumstances, may act as a Giffen good. However, no supporting evidence was offered, and evidence from the large increases in oil prices in 2008 would suggest that quantity demanded for gasoline did actually fall as a result of increased prices. Of course, the lack of evidence at the aggregate level does not rule out that the proposed goods may have been Giffen for certain groups of consumers—in particular for poor consumers. As shown by Hildenbrand's model, the aggregate demand will not exhibit any Giffen behavior even when we assume the same preferences for each consumer, whose nominal wealth are uniformly distributed on an interval containing zero. This explains the presence of Giffen-like behavior for individual consumers but the absence of aggregate data.

See also
Capital good
Consumer choice
Price elasticity of demand
Supply and demand
Ordinary good
Veblen good
Inferior good
Normal good

References

Further reading

External links
 Alfred Marshall Principles of Economics Bk.III,Ch.VI in paragraph III.VI.17
 The Last Word on Giffen Goods? 
 Giffen good
 What Do Prostitutes and Rice Have in Common?

Goods (economics)
Paradoxes in economics
Consumer theory